The 1954 Italian Athletics Championships was the 44th edition of the Italian Athletics Championships and were held in Florence, Padua and Rome from 1 to 10 October.

Champions

References

External links
 Italian Athletics Federation

Italian Athletics Championships
Athletics
Italian Athletics Outdoor Championships
Athletics competitions in Italy